ESPN College Hoops 2K5 is an American college basketball video game developed by Visual Concepts and published by Sega. It is a college basketball simulation available for the Xbox and PlayStation 2. It features former Stanford forward Josh Childress on the cover.

The game was released on November 17, 2004.

ESPN Broadcast
The game features an ESPN "broadcast", where the ESPN commentators and logos are seen throughout the season, with an authentic ESPN broadcast during the game. Mike Patrick and Jay Bilas provide play-by-play and color commentary, respectively.

Reception

The game was met with positive reception upon release.  GameRankings and Metacritic gave it a score of 86.28% and 86 out of 100 for the Xbox version, and 84.98% and 86 out of 100 for the PlayStation 2 version.

References

External links
 
 Official 2K Sports ESPN College Hoops 2K5 site
 Official 2K Sports site for 2K5 online leagues and tournaments

2004 video games
PlayStation 2 games
Xbox games
College basketball video games in the United States
ESPN video games
Multiplayer and single-player video games
Sega games